"Al Despertar" (English: Waking Up) is the title of the sixth single released by Spanish singer-songwriter Enrique Iglesias from his second studio album, Vivir (1997), It was released on 8 December 1997 (see 1997 in music).

Song information
The track was written by Enrique Iglesias and Roberto Morales and became the less successful of his singles in United States at the time, peaking only at number 11.

Chart performance
The track debuted on the United States Billboard Hot Latin Tracks chart at number 18 on 7 March 1998 and peaked at number 11 three weeks later on 28 March 1998.

References

1997 singles
1997 songs
Enrique Iglesias songs
Spanish songs
Songs written by Enrique Iglesias
Songs written by Roberto Morales
Fonovisa Records singles